The (You Drive Me) Crazy Tour (also known as Crazy 2k Tour) was the second concert tour by American entertainer Britney Spears, launched in support of her first and second studio albums, ...Baby One More Time (1999) and Oops!... I Did It Again (2000). The tour was designed as a continuation of the ...Baby One More Time Tour (1999) and a prelude to the Oops!... I Did It Again Tour (2000). It was sponsored by Got Milk? and Polaroid.

The tour was divided into various segments, with each segment being followed by an interlude to the next segment, and it ended with an encore. The set list consisted of nine songs, seven from ...Baby One More Time and two from Oops!... I Did It Again, her then-upcoming album. During the tour, Spears was accused of lip synching, although she denied these claims. The show was recorded and broadcast on Fox, and a DVD entitled Britney Spears: Live and More! was released in November 2000.

Background and development 
On December 17, 1999, during the premiere of the music video for "From the Bottom of My Broken Heart" on Total Request Live, Spears called the show to announce March US tour dates. The tour was designed as a continuation of the ...Baby One More Time Tour and a prelude to her future world tour. The leg's main sponsor was Got Milk?. Media director Peter Gardiner explained, "Britney is magic with teen-age girls, and that's an absolutely crucial target for milk". Spears shot an advertising campaign to be shown before her performances began. The secondary sponsor was Polaroid and the corporation released the Polaroid I-Zone as the official camera of the tour. Spears also used the I-Zone onstage to take pictures of the audience and further promote the product.

The stage of the (You Drive Me) Crazy Tour was similar to that of the ...Baby One More Time Tour, although much bigger. There were many special effects, including smoke machines and fireworks that erupted during the show. There was a giant projection screen that resembled the magical mirror from Snow White and the Seven Dwarfs (1937). Also present was a mechanical magic carpet in which Spears sat and flew over the first 100 feet above the crowd. Spears, who had five costumes changes during the show, was joined on stage by eight dancers. The setlist consisted of nine songs, seven from her debut album and two unreleased songs from her then upcoming album, Oops!... I Did It Again (2000).

Concert synopsis 
The show opened with a skit in which the dancers came out of lockers and stayed in the stage until a bell rang. They all sat until a female teacher voice started calling their names. After the teacher called Spears, she emerged at the top of the staircase in a cloud of smoke, wearing a top and white stretch pants, to perform a short dance mix of "...Baby One More Time". She then entered one of the lockers and appeared in another one on the opposite side of the stage to perform "(You Drive Me) Crazy". Spears briefly talked to the audience, the segment continued with performances of "Born to Make You Happy" and "I Will Be There". After a dance interlude, Spears appeared onstage sitting on the magic carpet and flew over the audience while singing "Don't Let Me Be the Last to Know". When she returned to the stage, she performed another song from her upcoming album, "Oops!... I Did It Again". Spears addressed the audience again before the "Who is the Ultimate Heartbreaker?" interlude, in which her dancers picked a boy from the audience and invited him onstage. Spears took to the stage again wearing a jacket and dedicated the performance of "From the Bottom of My Broken Heart" to the boy. She took off her jacket to reveal a pair of black pants that featured a sequined red heart in the back and performed "The Beat Goes On". After two interludes that presented her dancers and band, Spears appeared onstage to perform "Sometimes". The encore consisted of a dance-oriented performance of "...Baby One More Time".

Critical response
Jae-Ha Kim of the Chicago Sun-Times said that Spears "showed why she has got a leg up on blonder competitors such as Christina Aguilera, Jessica Simpson and Mandy Moore. Aguilera may have a better voice (and a Grammy to validate it), but Spears has that 'it' factor that worked for pinup queens of the past, such as Farrah Fawcett". Adam Graham of Central Michigan Life commented that "although the show was only about 10 songs long and the authenticity of her voice was in question throughout, it was really truly hard to walk away feeling anything but completely gratified". Dave Tianen of the Milwaukee Journal Sentinel believed that the show "was energetic, good-humored, fast-paced and bright".

During the tour, accusations of lip synching arose. Spears talked to Rolling Stone about the accusations, saying,
"There's a delay in the screen above me, so if you listen to the music and watch the screen, they don't sync up. I think that confuses people. But I'm singing every song. I'm singing my ass off. [...] There are times during the show, when I'm dancing so much, where I get out of breath, and we have a signal where I'm dying and they'll help me out. Believe me, I'd give anything to do a show where I just sit there and sing".

Broadcasts and recordings

On April 24, 2000, the concert at Hilton Hawaiian Village in Honolulu, Hawaii was taped. On June 5, 2000, it was broadcast in a special in Fox. On November 21, 2000, Jive Records released the Britney Spears: Live and More! DVD, which included the Fox special. It was certified three-times platinum by the Recording Industry Association of America (RIAA) for shipment of 300,000 copies in DVD units.

Supporting acts
LFO (North America) (select venues)
Destiny's Child (Hawaii)

Set list
The following set list is from the show on March 14, 2000, in  Auburn Hills, Michigan. It is not representative of all concerts for the duration of the tour.

"(You Drive Me) Crazy"
"Born to Make You Happy"
"I Will Be There"
"Don't Let Me Be the Last to Know"
"Oops!... I Did It Again"
"From the Bottom of My Broken Heart"
"The Beat Goes On"
"Sometimes"

Encore
 "...Baby One More Time"

Tour dates

Cancelled shows

Box office score data

Notes

References 

Britney Spears concert tours
2000 concert tours

fr:Crazy 2K Tour